Christina Hole (1896 – 24 November 1985) was an award-winning British folklorist and author, who was described as “for many years the leading authority on English folk customs and culture”.

Early life and education 
Hole was born in Rickmansworth in 1896 and brought up in Kingston-on-Thames by her grandmother. She was educated at St Bernard's Convent in Slough before finishing her education in France.

Before the Second World War she worked in Cheshire as an organizer for the Conservative Party. During the Second World War she was for some time Oxfordshire Women's Land Army County Secretary.

Author 
It was during her pre-war activities in Cheshire that Hole started to collect folklore seriously, activities that led to her first dedicated folklore book, Traditions and Customs of Cheshire (1937).

Hole's many books were aimed at a popular audience and have been described as being “characterised by their gentle lucidity and common sense”. She wrote introductory works on ghosts and witchcraft but is best known for her works on traditional British folk custom; which have been praised for focusing on how customs are performed in the present day, rather than speculating on their "remote origins and lost meanings".

As well as being an author, Hole also acted as an editor of folklore books. For example, in the early 1960s, she acted as joint-editor of European Folktales, published in Copenhagen in 1963 for the Council of Europe.

Folklore Society 
Hole joined the Folklore Society in 1941.
In 1956 she became a member of the Folklore Society's Council. Prior to this, Hole had organised the Society for Oxfordshire and District Folklore with Prof E. O. James, then editor of the Folklore Society's journal Folk-lore. On James's retirement as editor, Hole took on the role, a position she held until 1979.
Under her editorship, the journal "improved in quality and size", in no small part due to Hole's labours (even with Hole refusing to have a telephone installed in her Oxford home).

Recognition 
On her retirement from her editorship of Folklore, Hole was awarded the Folklore Society's Coote-Lake Medal for "outstanding research and scholarship" in the field of Folklore Studies.

In an appreciation by Katharine Briggs, Hole was described as being "one of the last of the nineteenth-century cultured ladies...who never went to College", but nevertheless were renowned for their expertise and knowledge in their particular fields.

Selected publications 
 Hole, Christina (1934). Wonder Tales of the British Empire. Manchester: Sherratt & Hughes. .
 Hole, Christina (1936). Folk-tales of Many Nations. Place of publication not identified: publisher not identified. .
 Hole, Christina (1937). Traditions and Customs of Cheshire,. London: Williams and Norgate. .
 Hole, Christina (1940). Haunted England: A Survey of English Ghost-lore. London: B.T. Batsford. .
 Hole, Christina (1941). English Custom and Usage. London: B.T. Batsford Ltd. .
 Hole, Christina (1943). English Folk-Heroes London; New York; Toronto; Sydney: B.T. Batsford. .
 Hole, Christina; Peake, Mervyn (illustrator) (1945). Witchcraft in England. London: Batsford. .
 Hole, Christina (1947). English Home-life: 1500-1800: Illustrated from Portraits, Paintings and Prints. London; Toronto; New York; Sydney: B. T. Batsford Ltd. .
 Hole, Christina (1949). English Sports and Pastimes. London: B. T. Batsford. .
 Hole, Christina (1951). The English Housewife in the Seventeenth century. .
 Hole, Christina (1954). English Shrines and Sanctuaries. London: Batsford. .
 Hole, Christina (1957). A Mirror of Witchcraft. London. .
 Hole, Christina (1961). Easter and its Customs: A Brief Study. London: Richard Bell. .
 Radford, Edwin; Radford, Mona Augusta; Hole, Christina (eds.) (1961). Encyclopedia of Superstitions. London: Hutchinson. .
 Bodker, Laurits; d'Aronco, Gianfranco; Hole, Christina (eds.) (1963). European Folk Tales. Copenhagen: Rosenkilde and Bagger. .
 Hole, Christina (1965). Saints in Folklore. London: G. Bell & Sons. .
 Hole, Christina (1975). English Traditional Customs. London: Batsford. . .
 Hole, Christina (1976). British Folk Customs. London: Hutchinson. . .

References

Further reading 
Simpson, Jacqueline (2001). 'Christina Hole' in Blacker, Carmen; Davidson, Hilda Roderick Ellis (eds.). Women and tradition: a neglected group of folklorists. Durham, NC: Carolina Academic Press. . .

1896 births
1985 deaths
British folklorists
Women folklorists
People from Rickmansworth